Jeff Ryan may refer to:

Jeff Ryan (ATF agent)
Jeff Ryan (baseball)
Jeff Ryan (curler), Canadian curler

See also
Ryan (surname)